James Ready may refer to:

James Ready (beer), a Canadian beer brand
James Ready, founder of American software company MontaVista
Jim Ready, member of British musical group Trash Fashion